Vanceboro is a census-designated place (CDP) and the primary village in the town of Vanceboro, Washington County, Maine, United States. It is in northeastern Washington County, on the west side of the St. Croix River, which forms the Canada–United States border. Directly across the border is the small community of St. Croix, New Brunswick.

Maine State Route 6 passes through the center of Vanceboro, crossing the St. Croix River at the Vanceboro - St. Croix Border Crossing. Route 6 leads southwest  to U.S. Route 1 in Topsfield, while to the east New Brunswick Route 4 leads  to Thomaston Corner. The community is also the site of the Saint Croix–Vanceboro Railway Bridge, the only crossing between Canada and the United States to be attacked by a foreign force.

Vanceboro was first listed as a CDP prior to the 2020 census.

Demographics

References 

Census-designated places in Washington County, Maine
Census-designated places in Maine